Richard Gardner (born 4 October 1938) is a Zimbabwean sports shooter. He competed in the mixed skeet event at the 1980 Summer Olympics.

References

External links
 

1938 births
Living people
Zimbabwean male sport shooters
Olympic shooters of Zimbabwe
Shooters at the 1980 Summer Olympics
Place of birth missing (living people)